Eugene Franklin Zimmerlink Jr. (born March 26, 1963) is a former American football tight end who played for the Atlanta Falcons of the National Football League (NFL). He played college football at University of Virginia.

References 

1963 births
Living people
American football tight ends
Atlanta Falcons players
People from Milltown, New Jersey
Players of American football from New Jersey
Sportspeople from Middlesex County, New Jersey
Virginia Cavaliers football players